Oginibo is a Town  in Ughelli South Local Government Area of Delta State, Nigeria.

References

Populated places in Delta State